Parliamentary elections have not been held in Yemen since 2003. As the term of the House of Representatives is six years and the last elections were in 2003, the next elections were originally set for 27 April 2009, but President Ali Abdullah Saleh postponed them by two years on 24 February 2009 because, Saleh claimed, of the threat of an electoral boycott by a coalition of opposition parties called the Joint Meeting Parties (JMP).

However, elections did not take place on 27 April 2011 either and they were planned to be held alongside the next presidential election, scheduled for sometime in February 2014. A special presidential election was held in 2012. In January 2014, the final session of the National Dialogue Conference announced that both elections had been delayed, and would occur within 9 months of a referendum on a new constitution which had yet to be drafted. However both the GPC and Houthi representatives on the National Authority for Monitoring the Implementation of NDC Outcomes have refused to vote on the new constitution drafted by the constitution drafting committee, which submitted it in January 2015.

References

Cancelled elections
Parliamentary election,9999
Yemeni parliamentary election